The Advisory Circular AC 20-115(), Airborne Software Development Assurance Using EUROCAE ED-12( ) and RTCA DO-178( ) (previously Airborne Software Assurance), identifies the RTCA published standard DO-178 as defining a suitable means for demonstrating compliance for the use of software within aircraft systems. The present revision D of the circular identifies ED-12/DO-178 Revision C as the active revision of that standard and particularly acknowledges the synchronization of ED-12 and DO-178 at that revision.

This Advisory Circular calls attention to ED-12C/DO-178C as "an acceptable means, but not the only means," to secure FAA approval of software. The earliest revisions of the Advisory Circular were brief, serving little more than to call attention to active DO-178 revisions. The Advisory Circular revisions C and D are considerably longer, giving guidance in modifying and re-using software previously approved using DO-178, DO-178A, or DO-178B (preceding revisions of the DO-178 standard). Additionally, the expanded AC provides guidance for Field Loadable Software and User Modifiable Software within aircraft software. Transition of legacy tool qualification from DO-178B to DO-330 is also discussed, with comparison of ED-12B/DO-178B Tool Qualification Type with ED-12C/ED-215 DO-178C/DO-330 Tool Qualification Level.

Revision History

References

External links  
 AC 20-115D, Airborne Software Assurance

Avionics
Safety
Software requirements
RTCA standards
Computer standards